Frederick Steele (January 14, 1819 – January 12, 1868) was a career military officer in the United States Army, serving as a major general in the Union Army during the American Civil War. He was most noted for retaking much of secessionist Arkansas for the Union cause, escaping the besieged port-city of Camden through successful deception tactics, and defeating Sterling Price and E. Kirby Smith at Jenkins Ferry.

Early life
Steele, son of Nathaniel & Dameras (Johnson) Steele, was born in Delhi, New York. He was an 1843 graduate of West Point, and later served in the Mexican–American War, where he participated in many engagements. Steele was meritoriously mentioned for distinguished bravery, and was promoted to first lieutenant in June 1848. He served in California during the Yuma War until 1853, and then to Fort Ridgely in Minnesota Territory and then Kansas Territory, and Nebraska Territory until the Civil War.  He received his captain's commission on February 5, 1855.

Civil War
On May 14, 1861, Steele was appointed major in the 11th U.S. Infantry and fought at the Battle of Wilson's Creek. On September 23, 1861, he became colonel of the 8th Iowa Infantry. On January 30, 1862, Steele was appointed brigadier general of U.S. volunteers, to rank from January 29, 1862. He commanded the District of Southeast Missouri, but following the Union victory at the Battle of Pea Ridge he took command of the 1st Division in the Army of the Southwest and briefly commanded the army from August 29 to October 7, 1862. On March 17, 1863, President Lincoln appointed Steele major general of volunteers, to rank from November 29, 1862. The President sent the nomination to the U.S. Senate on March 6, 1863 and the Senate confirmed it on March 13, 1863.

Steele's division was transferred to the Army of the Tennessee becoming the 11th Division in the XIII Corps. He fought at the Battle of Chickasaw Bayou in December 1862 and in the Battle of Arkansas Post in January 1863. His division was renamed the 1st Division in Major General William T. Sherman's XV Corps during the Siege of Vicksburg.

On August 26, 1863, after the fall of Vicksburg, Steele received a brevet promotion to colonel in the U.S. Army. On July 27, 1863, he was placed in command of the Army of Arkansas. His army successfully captured Confederate-held Little Rock in September 1863 and subsequently pushed official Union boundaries south through the state. He was assigned command of VII Corps in the Department of Arkansas in the Trans-Mississippi Theater, holding command from January 6, 1864, to December 22, 1864. On March 23, 1864, Steele began his march with eight thousand soldiers from Little Rock south to Prairie D'Ane, where he was joined by John M. Thayer, who commanded another four thousand troops constituting the Frontier Division of VII Corps. Receiving intelligence from captured rebels there, and with his army on one quarter rations, Steele conducted a successful feint operation toward the rebel capital at Washington, Arkansas, and left Thayer's division on the prairie, while he moved his main column eastward to Camden, believing that it contained stockpiles of provisions and forage for his horses. Upon entering Camden after brushing aside light opposition on April 15, Steele discovered that the enemy had destroyed most of the provisions and supplies there. But he also discovered messages in the Camden telegraph office carelessly left behind by the fleeing rebels confirming the earlier rumors and intelligence that General Banks had been repulsed at Mansfield Louisiana, and that Banks's army was in retreat down the Red river. Steele made the decision based on this confirmed intelligence, to await provisions en route from Little Rock and to scour the countryside for additional grain and forage, await developments in Louisiana and then decide whether to continue south or return to Little Rock. Price, meanwhile besieged Camden from the west, north and south. One supply train reached Camden from Little Rock by way of Pine Bluff on April 22, temporarily relieving the food crisis in VII Corps. When Steele dispatched the wagons under escort back to Pine Bluff for more provisions on April 23, it was intercepted and ambushed by a task force of 5 rebel cavalry brigades under James Fagan at Marks Mills April 25, where two thirds of the Union 2nd Brigade was taken prisoner. Learning of this disaster, Steele again employed a successful deception to exit from Camden, which operation was effected without detection on the night of April 26–27. Proceeding due north on the Military road to Little Rock, elements of Marmaduke's division caught up with VII Corps on the ridge above Jenkins Ferry on the Saline River on April 29, but were easily repulsed and kept at bay enabling Steele to install a pontoon bridge over the Saline and establish strong interior defensive works to guard the crossing. By now, rebel Department of the Trans-Mississippi commander E. Kirby Smith had arrived in Arkansas to take command of Price's force in the field.  Smith brought with him two divisions of Arkansas and Texas infantry.

Fighting at Jenkins Ferry commenced in a downpour the morning of 30 April. Critical mistakes in troop management by both Price and Kirby Smith resulted in the rebel army committing its divisions in a piecemeal fashion, allowing Steele and his subordinates, Brigadier Generals Frederick  Salomon and Samuel Rice, to engage and destroy the attacking rebels in turn with light casualties. The Confederates suffered heavily in this defeat; rebel Generals Marmaduke, Mosby Parsons and John Walker were effectively repulsed in three poorly executed rebel assaults. Indeed, Walker was so thoroughly beaten with 2 of his 3 brigade commanders lying dead on the field, that he refused to submit his casualty report out of embarrassment. Through a further deception operation (reported independently after the war by a Union officer of the 77th Ohio and a Confederate sergeant in General Jo Shelby's command) General James Fagan's heretofore mentioned task force of 5 cavalry brigades was mis-directed away from Jenkins Ferry and did not reach there until the fighting ended. Steele took his army back to Little Rock having won the largest engagement west of the Mississippi during the war. In point of fact, Steele sent several messages to Union Army Chief of Staff Henry Halleck, to Sherman and to his Department commander General John Schofield prior to the expedition, warning of a dearth of forage and provisions in southwest Arkansas, and also calling the military competency of political general Nathaniel Banks into question. Steele was finally compelled, against his better judgment, by newly appointed General-in-Chief Ulysses Grant (and Steele's classmate at West Point) to undertake the expedition to cooperate with Banks. Thus, when the intelligence confirmed Bank's failure against Dick Taylor in Louisiana, Steele had already formulated a plan to save the VII Corps.

Steele led a force of African American soldiers, officially designated the "Column from Pensacola", in Major General Edward Canby's Army of West Mississippi between February 18, 1865 and May 18, 1865. His troops fought at the battles of Spanish Fort and Fort Blakely.

On April 10, 1866, President Andrew Johnson nominated Steele for appointment to the brevet rank of brigadier general in the regular army, for services in the capture of Little Rock, to rank from March 13, 1865, and the U.S. Senate confirmed the appointment on May 4, 1866. On June 30, 1866, President Andrew Johnson nominated Steele for appointment to the brevet rank of major general in the regular army, for the Siege of Vicksburg and services during the war, to rank from March 13, 1865 and the U.S. Senate confirmed the appointment on July 25, 1866.

Postbellum career
Steele was transferred to Texas in June 1865 and placed in command of United States forces along the Rio Grande. He subsequently commanded the Department of the Columbia, overseeing the Snake War. from December 1865 until November 1867.  On July 28, 1866, Steele had been appointed to the permanent grade of colonel of the 20th U.S. Infantry Regiment. Meanwhile, he had been mustered out of the volunteer service on March 1, 1867.

In November 1867, Frederick Steele took a leave of absence for health reasons.  He died two months later on January 12, 1868, in San Mateo, California from an injury suffered in a fall in a buggy accident caused when he suffered an apoplectic fit. He was originally buried in Lone Mountain Cemetery in San Francisco. However his remains were moved in 1912 when the city removed all its cemeteries from within the city limits. He is buried in Woodlawn Memorial Park Cemetery, Colma, California.

A monument to Steele stands on the Vicksburg National Military Park.

See also

 List of American Civil War generals (Union)

Notes

References
 Eicher, John H., and David J. Eicher, Civil War High Commands. Stanford: Stanford University Press, 2001. .
 Winters, John D. The Civil War in Louisiana. Baton Rouge: Louisiana State University Press, 1963. .
Attribution

External links
 
 Steele monument at Vicksburg

Union Army generals
1819 births
Steele, Fredericke
American military personnel of the Mexican–American War
Members of the Aztec Club of 1847
People from Delhi, New York
United States Military Academy alumni
People of New York (state) in the American Civil War
Snake War
Burials at Woodlawn Memorial Park Cemetery (Colma, California)